Reese Milner is an American bridge player. He is a Bridge World Champion. He lives in Sarasota. Milner ranks number 1 in the World Bridge Federation Seniors List as of December 2020
.

Bridge accomplishments

Wins

 World Senior Teams Championship (1) 2010
 North American Bridge Championships (3)
 Senior Knockout Teams (1) 2008 
 Keohane North American Swiss Teams (1) 2012 
 Vanderbilt (1) 2002

Runners-up

 World Transnational Open Teams Championship (1) 2000 
 World Olympiad Seniors Teams Championship (1) 2008
 North American Bridge Championships (2)
 Mitchell Board-a-Match Teams (1) 2003 
 von Zedtwitz Life Master Pairs (1) 2004

Notes

External links
 

American contract bridge players
Year of birth missing (living people)
Living people